The Astronomical Roentgen Telescope X-ray Concentrator (ART-XC) is an X-ray telescope with a grazing incidence mirror that is capable of capturing high energy X-ray photons within the 5-30 keV energy range. This telescope is one of the two X-ray telescopes on the Spektr-RG (SRG) mission. The other telescope that SRG carries is eROSITA. The observatory was launched on 13 July 2019 via a Proton rocket from the Russian launch site Baikonur in Kazakhstan.

Overview

ART-XC was developed by the Space Research Institute (IKI) and the All-Russian Scientific Research Institute for Experimental Physics (VNIIEF). The NASA Marshall Space Flight Center (MSFC) has developed and fabricated flight models of the X-ray mirror systems. The ART-XC telescope consists of 7 identical mirror modules each made with 28 nickel-cobalt grazing-incidence mirrors. The mirror design is Wolter-I and is coated with iridium. Each module also has its own cadmium-tellurium double-sided strip detector. The typical on-axis half-power diameter of ART-XC is 27 to 34 arcsec, while the effective area of each module is 65 cm2 (both were estimated at 8 keV). The field of view for each module is about 36′ in diameter.

ART-XC will survey the entire sky every six months, and the planned all-sky survey will be completed in the first four years of the mission.

First light 
Roscosmos published the first light image of ART-XC, which was taken on July 30, 2019. The image shows the source Centaurus X-3 imaged with the 7 telescopes, as well as the light curve of the pulsar folded at its pulse period of 4.8s.

Instruments

References

X-ray telescopes